St John the Baptist's Church is in the village of Guilden Sutton, near Chester, Cheshire, England.  It is recorded in the National Heritage List for England as a designated Grade II listed building.  It is an active Anglican parish church.  The church is in the diocese of Chester, the archdeaconry of Chester and the deanery of Chester.  Its benefice is combined with that of St Peter, Plemstall.

History

The church was built in 1815 on the site of a previous church.  The chancel of the previous church had blown down in 1802.  A bellcote was added during the Victorian era.  The interior was restored in 2001 when the chancel screen and choir stalls were removed, a toilet was provided and the entrance was improved.  In 2005 the bellcote was restored after it had been damaged by death watch beetle.

Architecture

Exterior

The church is built in brick with Welsh slate roofs.  Some of the fabric of the 16th-century church is still present in the wall of the nave.  Its plan is simple and consists of a five-bay nave and chancel in one range, a south porch, and an octagonal louvred timber bellcote at the west end.  The windows on the sides of the nave and chancel are simple and round-headed.  The east window is lancet-shaped.

Interior
This is plain, with a raised chancel.  There was formerly a wooden chancel screen.  The doorway has twisted balusters and is dated 1698.  In the church is a painted memorial plaque to the Whitehead family, which is probably by Randle Holme III.  The font is dated 1635; it is round and decorated with the date and a single flower.

External features

In the churchyard is a buff sandstone sundial.  It consists of column baluster on a square base with a cap in a different stone.  The copper plate and gnomon are inscribed with the date 1596 and two sets of lines and numbers.  It is listed Grade II.  The churchyard also contains the war graves of three soldiers, two of World War I and one of World War II.

See also

Listed buildings in Guilden Sutton

References

Churches completed in 1815
19th-century Church of England church buildings
Church of England church buildings in Cheshire
Grade II listed churches in Cheshire
Diocese of Chester